Irving Wheeler Small (July 19, 1891 – April 15, 1933) was an American ice hockey player who competed in the 1924 Winter Olympics. He was a member of the American ice hockey team, which won the silver medal in the 1924 Chamonix games.

Biography
Irving Small was born in Cambridge, Massachusetts, and died in Monrovia, California. He was brought up in Massachusetts and played amateur hockey as a member of the Boston AA team. In 1913, however, he moved to California, but came east to play hockey during the winters. He made the 1924 ice hockey team while still a member of the Boston AA.

References

External links

1891 births
1933 deaths
American men's ice hockey players
Boston Athletic Association ice hockey players
Ice hockey players from Massachusetts
Ice hockey players at the 1924 Winter Olympics
Medalists at the 1924 Winter Olympics
Olympic silver medalists for the United States in ice hockey
Westminster Hockey Club ice hockey players